The Hyundai Mighty (hangul:현대 마이티) is a line of light-duty commercial vehicle by Hyundai Motor Company. The range was primarily available in Korea and some other countries.

Manufactured from 1987 with the first cars going to Asia, other European and American countries which saw import or manufacture of the Mighty included Europe, Mid-east, Africa, and South America. Korea was another market until early 1987. In many markets the Mighty was very expensive and was replaced by the Hyundai Truck when that model became available in 1987 to 1997. In North America the Mighty was known as the Bering LD.

The overseas was another important market for the Mighty - to the extent that it was manufactured there from the 1980s using many local components.

In Europe, Mid-East, Africa, South America, its principal competitors are Kia Titan, Kia Trade, Kia Frontier.

Models 

 Hyundai Mighty 1st Generation:Mitsubishi Fuso design, Platform and Rebadged in Mitsubishi Fuso Canter, Manufacture period: 1987-1994
 Hyundai Mighty 2nd Generation:Hyundai & Mitsubishi Fuso design, Manufacture period: 1994-1997
 Standard Cab Low Long Cargo (2.5t)
 Standard Cab Shot Cargo (2.5t)
 Standard Cab Long Cargo (2.5t, 3.5t)
 Double Crew Cab Long Cargo (2.5t)
 Standard Cab Shot Dump (2.5t, 3.5t)
 Hyundai Mighty II (October 1997 - October 2004) The Mighty II, which was launched on October 20, 1997, was developed independently by Hyundai Motors, which is different from the existing Mighty, and pursued ride quality of passenger cars.

Mighty
Rear-wheel-drive vehicles
Vehicles introduced in 1987